Leça da Palmeira is a former civil parish in the municipality of Matosinhos in the Greater Porto area, Portugal. In 2013, the parish merged into the new parish Matosinhos e Leça da Palmeira. It has 5.97 km² and had 17.215 inhabitants in the 2001 census.

It has a rich cultural heritage, namely Fort of Leça da Palmeira, Piscinas de Marés (Swimming Pools on the Beach) developed by the well-known architect Siza Vieira, Boa Nova Tea House (also developed by Siza Vieira), Quinta da Conceição Municipal Park (by Fernando Távora) and other religious monuments as Corpo Santo, Santana, and Boa Nova churches.

It is home of the international Leixões seaport, the country's second largest; Petrogal, and an oil refinery. In sport, the parish includes a football club, Leça FC, and a basketball club, Grupo Desportivo de Basquete de Leça.

References

External links
Junta de Freguesia de Leça da Palmeira
Câmara Municipal de Matosinhos
Grupo Desportivo de Basquete de Leca

Former parishes of Matosinhos